The yen and yuan sign, ¥, is a currency sign used for the Japanese yen and the Chinese yuan currencies when writing in Latin scripts. This monetary symbol resembles a Latin letter Y with a single or double horizontal stroke. The symbol is usually placed before the value it represents, for example: ¥50, or JP¥50 and CN¥50 when disambiguation is needed.

History

Japan 
After the institution of Japan’s New Currency Act, from 1871 through the early 20th century, the yen was either referred to (in documents printed in Latin script) by its full name yen, or abbreviated with a capital "Y". One of the earliest uses of  can be found in J. Twizell Wawn’s "Japanese Municipal Government With an Account of the Administration of the City of Kobe", published in 1899. Usage of the sign increased in the early 20th century, primarily in Western English-speaking countries, but has also become commonly used in Japan as well.

Code points 
Additionally, there is a full width character, at code point  for use with wide fonts, especially East Asian fonts.

There was no code-point for any ¥ symbol in the original (7-bit) US-ASCII and consequently many early systems reassigned  (allocated to the backslash (\) in ASCII) to the yen sign. With the arrival of 8-bit encoding, the ISO/IEC 8859-1 ("ISO Latin 1") character set assigned code point  to the ¥ in 1985; Unicode continues this encoding.

In JIS X 0201, of which Shift JIS is an extension, assigns code point  to the Latin-script yen sign: as noted above, this is the code used for the backslash in ASCII and also subsequently in Unicode. The JIS X 0201 standard was widely adopted in Japan.

Microsoft Windows
Microsoft adopted the ISO code  in Windows-1252 for the Americas and Western Europe but Japanese-language locales of Microsoft operating systems use the code page 932 character encoding, which is a variant of Shift JIS. Hence, 0x5C is displayed as a yen sign in Japanese-locale fonts on Windows. It is nonetheless used wherever a backslash is used, such as the directory separator character (for example, in C:¥) and as the general escape character (¥n). It is mapped onto the Unicode U+005C REVERSE SOLIDUS (i.e. backslash), while Unicode U+00A5 YEN SIGN is given a one-way "best fit" mapping to 0x5C in code page 932, and 0x5C is displayed as a backslash in Microsoft's documentation for code page 932, essentially making it a backslash given the appearance of a yen sign by localized fonts. The won sign ₩ has similar issues in Korean versions of Windows.

IBM EBCDIC
IBM's Code page 437 used code point  for the ¥ and this encoding was also used by several other computer systems. The ¥ is assigned code point B2 in EBCDIC 500 and many other EBCDIC code pages.

Chinese IME 
Under Chinese Pinyin input method editors (IMEs) such as those from Microsoft or Sogou.com, typing  displays the full-width character , which is different from half-width  used in Japanese IMEs.

円, 元, and 圆/圓 

The name of the North Korean and South Korean won (₩) comes from the equivalent hanja  (won).

Turkmen 
In the 1993 Turkmen orthography, the Yen sign was used as the capital form of ÿ and represented the sound . It was replaced with Ý.

Notes

References 

Japanese yen
Renminbi
Currency symbols